

Scarborough TEC, (formerly known as Yorkshire Coast College, Scarborough Technical College, Scarborough Technical Institute, and Scarborough School of Art) is a further education college located on Filey Road Scarborough, North Yorkshire, England. It is a constituent college of the Grimsby Institute of Further & Higher Education.

Yorkshire Coast College was originally an independently controlled institution, but due to consistently poor results and long-term financial difficulties was taken over by the Grimsby Institute in January 2010.

College courses for students from Scarborough and the surrounding area include NVQs, GCSEs, BTECs, Apprenticeships and Access courses, and some higher education courses in conjunction with the University of Hull.

In November 2016, the name was changed from Yorkshire Coast College to Scarborough TEC, with the TEC standing for Training, Education, Careers.

Notable recent alumni
 Ryan Swain - TV & radio presenter, DJ and motivational speaker.
Chris Helme – lead vocalist with The Seahorses
 Oliver Knight – singer/songwriter
 James Martin – celebrity chef and television personality.
 Robert Palmer – recording artist
 Mark Richardson – drummer with Skunk Anansie
 Timothy Sheader – theatre artistic director
 Jon Snow – journalist and presenter of Channel 4 News

Alumni from period as Scarborough School of Art 1882-1907
Fred Appleyard – landscape artist
Frances Crawshaw - painter, botanical artist
Ernest Dade – painter, specialising in coastal and maritime subjects, and maker of model ships
Ian Hunter – painter and Dean of Fine Art at Central Saint Martins, London
Frank Henry Mason – maritime artist, and creator of art deco travel and railway posters
Albert Strange – Principal of the school for its first 35 years, yacht designer, and maritime artist
Harry Watson – landscape and portrait artist

References

External links
 Official website
 Grimsby Institute of Further & Higher Education website

Buildings and structures in Scarborough, North Yorkshire
Education in Scarborough, North Yorkshire
Further education colleges in North Yorkshire